Phony Ppl is a musical group based in Brooklyn, New York. Originally founded in 2010 with five members; the current members are Elbee Thrie (vocals), Elijah Rawk (lead guitar), Matt "Maffyuu" Byas (drums), Aja Grant (keyboard), and Bari Bass (bass guitar).

Background
Members of Phony Ppl met in high school. Elbee (Robert Booker) and Aja first formed the group, with Dyme-A-Duzin (Donnovan Blocker), Bari Bass (Omar Grant), Elijah Rawk, Ian Bakerman, Temi O, Maffyuu, and Sheriff PJ joining later. In 2012, they released the album Phonyland.

In January 2015, they released the album Yesterday's Tomorrow. The album peaked at number 24 on the Billboard Heatseekers Album chart. It also peaked at number 15 on the Trending 140 chart and at number 7 on the Emerging Artists chart. They released the single "This Must Be Heaven" in November 2016. They made their first television appearance on June 9, 2015 on Jimmy Kimmel Live! performing "Trap Queen" with Fetty Wap.

In October 2018, they released the single "Something About Your Love" (stylized as "somethinG about your love."). Their album mō’zā-ik. was released on October 19, 2018. In January 2020, the group released "Fkn Around" with Megan Thee Stallion; their solo version was released in May. In November, they released the single "On My Shit" with Joey Badass.

On November 18, 2022, the group released a new album titled 'Euphonyus'. The album featured artists and production from JoJo, Kaytranada, Leon Thomas, and Domo Genesis.

Discography

Singles

Albums

References

External links
 

Musical groups from Brooklyn
Musical groups established in 2010
2010 establishments in New York City